Adintoviridae is a family of viruses.

Taxonomy
The family contains the following two genera, which contain one species each:

 Alphadintovirus
 Alphadintovirus mayetiola
 Betadintovirus
 Betadintovirus terrapene

References

Virus families